The European Society for Fuzzy Logic and Technology (EUSFLAT) is a scientific association with the aims to disseminate and promote fuzzy logic and related subjects (sometimes comprised under the collective terms soft computing or computational intelligence) and to provide a platform for exchange between scientists and engineers working in these fields. The society is both open for academic and industrial members.

History

EUSFLAT was founded in 1998 in Spain as the successor of the National Spanish Fuzzy Logic Society, ESTYLF, with the aim to open the society for members from other European countries. Since then, the society managed to attract a large share of members from outside Spain, and even beyond Europe, with the Spanish members still being the largest group inside EUSFLAT. For these historical reasons, the society is officially registered in Spain.

Conferences

Starting with 1999, EUSFLAT has been organizing its biannual conferences in odd years. Previous meetings:

Palma de Mallorca, Balearic Islands, Spain, September 22–25, 1999 (jointly with National Spanish conference, ESTYLF)
Leicester, United Kingdom, September 5–7, 2001
Zittau, Germany, September 10–12, 2003
Barcelona, Catalonia, Spain, September 7–9, 2005 (jointly with 11th Rencontres Francophones sur la Logique Floue et ses Applications)
Ostrava, Czech Republic, September 11–14, 2007
Lisbon, Portugal, July 20–24, 2009 (jointly with 13th World Congress of the International Fuzzy Systems Association)
Aix-les-Bains, France, July 18–22, 2011 (jointly with Les Rencontres Francophones sur la Logique Floue et ses Applications)
Milan, Italy, September 11–13, 2013
Gijón, Spain, June, 30–3 July 2015

Publications

 EUSFLAT publishes the proceedings of its conferences in an open access manner.
 Until 2010, Mathware & Soft Computing was the official journal of EUSFLAT. On July 1, 2010, the International Journal of Computational Intelligence Systems (Atlantis Press,  (print) /  (on-line)) became the official journal of EUSFLAT.
 EUSFLAT publishes an electronic newsletter with three issues a year.

Presidents
EUSFLAT is led by the President, who is elected for a two-year period, and cannot serve for more than two consecutive periods.

 Francesc Esteva (1998–2011)
 Luis Magdalena  (2001–2005)
 Ulrich Bodenhofer (2005–2009)
 Javier Montero (2009–2013)
 Gabriella Pasi (2013–present)

References

External links
The EUSFLAT website

Information technology organizations based in Europe
Fuzzy logic
Mathematical societies
Organizations established in 1998
Non-profit organisations based in Spain